The 2007 Asian Youth Girls Volleyball Championship was held in Kamphaeng Phet, Thailand from 7 to 14 May 2007.

Results

|}

|}

Final standing

Awards
MVP:  Miyu Nagaoka
Best Scorer:  Lee Yeon-Ju
Best Spiker:  Miyu Nagaoka
Best Blocker:  Chen Shih-Ting
Best Server:  Yuki Kawai
Best Setter:  Si Eun-mi
Best Digger:  Kotoe Inoue
Best Receiver:  Airi Kawahara

References
 www.asianvolleyball.org

External links
FIVB

A
V
V
Asian women's volleyball championships